CHCD-FM is a Canadian radio station, broadcasting at 98.9 FM in Simcoe, Ontario, Canada. The station airs an adult contemporary format branded as 98.9 myFM.

History
The station was originally launched in 1956 as AM 1560 CFRS, a 250-watt daytimer owned by Simcoe Broadcasting. In 1974, the station moved to AM 1600, and adopted the callsign CHNR. The following year, the station was acquired by Redmond Broadcasting. In 1997, the station moved to FM 106.7 and adopted its current callsign;  in 2004, the station moved to its current frequency (98.9 FM) to improve signal reception in the area. After CHCD-FM's move to 98.9 MHz, the station became "CD98.9". In 2005, CHCD was denied to add a rebroadcaster at 93.1 FM in Haldimand County, Ontario (Nelles Corners).  It moved to hot adult contemporary by 2009, when rival CKPC-FM was acquired by Evanov Communications and switched to adult contemporary from hot adult contemporary.

In 2012, the CRTC approved the change to the ownership and effective control of Radiocorp Ltd. from a control exercised by James MacLeod to a control jointly exercised by Andrew Dickson and Jon Pole (My Broadcasting Corporation). Radiocorp Ltd. (CHCD Radio) was licensee of CHCD-FM. In 2013, CHCD-FM changed its branding to 98.9 myFM.

References

External links
 98.9 myFM
 
 

Hcd
Norfolk County, Ontario
Radio stations established in 1997
Hcd
1997 establishments in Ontario
HCD